Newtownmountkennedy is a small town in County Wicklow, Ireland. It acquired its present name in the mid-seventeenth-century, when Sir Robert Kennedy, M.P. for Kildare, made it his principal residence. It is just off the N11 road to Wexford, just south of Kilpedder and south-west of Greystones. The R772 regional road passes through the village. This was the main Dublin-Wexford route, the N11, but the village was bypassed by the new N11 dual carriageway in 1990. This town has one of the longest place names in Ireland.

Between the 2011 and 2016 census, the population of the town increased by 17.6% (from 2,410 to 2,835 inhabitants), one of the highest growth rates in County Wicklow on the period. The area is a dormitory town for some workers commuting to Bray and Dublin.

The headquarters of Coillte, the Irish Forestry Board, are situated in the village forest. Newtownmountkennedy is in the Roman Catholic parish of Kilquade and one of the Kilquade parish's two chapels of ease is located in the village at the junction with the Roundwood Road.

Education
Newtownmountkennedy Primary School (St. Joseph's Boys National School and St. Bridget's Girls National School) is located just west of the village. It was formerly split into three buildings, one for male students, and one for female students, while the third building was reserved for the Centre for Autism. The boys' school was known as St Joseph's, while the girls' school was known as St Bridget's. In 2007, the two schools were merged, leaving the lower classes (Junior infants, Senior infants and First class) in the former girls' school, while the remaining classes (Second class, Third class, Fourth class, Fifth class and Sixth class) took residence in the former boys' school.

The autism centre stayed in the third building. The name given to the new school is Newtownmountkennedy Primary School. The majority of secondary school students travel to the nearby Coláiste Chraobh Abhann in neighbouring Kilcoole.

Transport

The area is served by the 184 bus route connecting the town with Kilpedder, Greystones and Bray. Bus Éireann route 133 connects the town with Dublin, Bray and Wicklow. The closest train stations are Greystones and Kilcoole. Greystones and the further, bigger Bray Daly station are accessible by route 184. The nearest airport is Dublin Airport served by the 133X route three times a day and the nearest airfield is Newcastle Aerodrome. The closest ferry ports are Dublin to the north and Rosslare Europort to the south.

Sports

Gaelic games

The Gaelic Athletic Association club of Newtown, known in Irish as Báile úi gCearnaigh, is one of the oldest clubs in the country, being founded in 1887. The club has two adult teams, one contesting the Senior League and Championship, and one contesting the Junior A League and Championship. There are also underage teams, ranging from Minor (U-18) down to "Super Sevens" (U-8 and younger).

The club has a number of county championships to its name, including the County Senior Championship, won in 1964 and 1975.

Newtown GAA Club plays in the colours Black and White, leading to some fans to dub them "The Magpies".

Association football

Newtown has two association football (soccer) clubs, Newtown United and Newtown Juniors. Newtown Juniors are for players up until the age of 16. After that, they move on to the senior teams of Newtown United. Both teams use the same home ground, the Matt Kelly Community Grounds.

Golf
Druids Glen Golf Resort, which hosted the Irish open from 1996 to 1999, is located about a kilometre east of Newtown. Druids Heath Golf Course, another championship course, is also located in Druids Glen. Glen Mill Golf Club is located to the south of Newtown, past Killadreenan.

Economy

Coillte, the Irish Forestry operator, has its headquarters just north of the town. French company Procap had its Northern European plant in the town. There is also a small industrial estate located to the south of the town.

The Parkview Hotel opened in the village centre in March 2007. The hotel has 60 bedrooms and conference facilities.

Ecologic received planning permission to build a data centre in Newtownmountkennedy that has an area of 1.1 million square feet (100,000 square metres). This plan was approved by the Supreme Court in December 2013 after numerous appeals by An Bord Pleanála and quashing the High Court's refusal to approve the development.

There is also a shopping centre in the town, which includes a Dunnes Stores, a pharmacy and a cafe. A major development was the creation, in 2015, of a new housing development "Wicklow Hills" which comprises a mix of two, three and four-bedroom houses.

People
Clive Clarke, former footballer.
Sonny Condell, Irish singer-songwriter, multi-instrumentalist, and graphic artist.
Leo Cullen, coach (and former captain) of Leinster Rugby.
Paul Heffernan, former professional footballer with several English Football League and Scottish Premiership sides.
Sir Richard Kennedy, 2nd Baronet, High Court judge and head of the Kennedy family who gave their name to the town.
Dean Odlum, sportsperson.

References

External links

Towns and villages in County Wicklow